Rarities & Remixes is the sixth album by contemporary Christian music group Point of Grace. It was released in 2000 by Word Records.

The album consists of eight remixes of songs from the group's first two albums, Point of Grace and The Whole Truth; "Forever On and On," taken from a compilation album, Streams; an acoustic performance of "Circle of Friends" from the group's third album, Life, Love & Other Mysteries; and five live performances predating the group's signing to Word Records.

Track listing

References

Point of Grace albums
2000 remix albums